Constant Allart (2 March 1796 - 13 September 1861) was a French politician. He served as a member of the National Constituent Assembly  from 1848 to 1849, and the Corps législatif from 1852 to 1861, representing Somme. He also served as the mayor of Amiens from 1851 to 1860.

References

1796 births
1861 deaths
People from Aisne
Party of Order politicians
Bonapartists
Members of the 1848 Constituent Assembly
Members of the 1st Corps législatif of the Second French Empire
Members of the 2nd Corps législatif of the Second French Empire
Mayors of places in Hauts-de-France